Brohlbach may refer to:

Brohlbach (Moselle), a river of Rhineland-Palatinate, Germany, tributary of the Moselle
Brohlbach (Rhine), a river of Rhineland-Palatinate, Germany, tributary of the Rhine